was a Japanese architect.

Early career

Yoshimura dated his desire to become an architect to the day he first entered Frank Lloyd Wright's Imperial Hotel in Tokyo, shortly after the Kanto earthquake of 1923. "“It was the first time that I felt emotional when faced with architecture. I said to my myself, this really shows the power of space. I felt that architecture was something extraordinary. It’s certainly the main reason I became an architect.” 

In December 1928, while a student at Tokyo's Fine Arts College, Yoshimura began part-time work at Antonin Raymond's office, becoming full-time after he graduated in 1931. Among other work, he performed on-site supervision for the Akaboshi Cottage (1931) for Japanese golfer Shiro Akaboshi, a house for Kisuke Akaboshi (1932) and the Kawasaki House (1934).

In May 1940 he travelled to Antonin's home in New Hope, Pennsylvania, spending fourteen months living and working in the studio there. He oversaw the installation of a small tea house at the Japan Institute in New York City.

Later career

On his return to Tokyo in 1941 he set up his own practice. In 1953, because of his connections with Raymond, Yoshimura secured the project to design a traditional Japanese Tea House in the garden of the Museum of Modern Art in New York.  This house, named Shofuso, or Pine Breeze Villa, was moved to Philadelphia, Pennsylvania, in 1957, where it remains as a historic site open to the public as Shofuso Japanese House and Garden.

In 1955 he collaborated with Kunio Maekawa and Junzo Sakakura to design the International House of Japan in Roppongi, Tokyo. This cultural exchange complex is located within estates owned by samurai lords in the Edo period. It is constructed in-situ thin-set reinforced concrete walls, pre-cast concrete columns and beams and Oya Stone.

Yoshimura's later works include the Tikotin Museum of Japanese Art (1959) in Haifa,  Tokyo Imperial Palace (1968), Japan House (with George G. Shimamoto of Kelly & Gruzen, 1969–71) in New York City, the East and West Wings of the Nara National Museum (1972) and the Royal Norwegian Embassy (1977) in Tokyo.

With his colleagues, he won the Prize of the Architectural Institute of Japan for Specific Contribution for the International House of Japan.

Footnotes

References
 
 
 Spring 2005, "Do_co,mo.mo Japan: the 100 selection", The Japan Architect, No57
 

1908 births
1997 deaths
People from Tokyo
20th-century Japanese architects